Cycle of Nemesis is a science fiction novel by the British writer Kenneth Bulmer. It was first published in 1967.

Plot summary
The novel begins in a near future world of ray guns and robots, but ends up marching all over time. Khamushkei the Undying, a horror out of space, destroyed an ancient civilization on earth, but ended up locked away in a Time Vault. After seven millennia, the vaults seals are giving way, and five average citizens are caught up in a race to reseal the vault - even though they know it will cost one of them her life.

References

1967 British novels
1967 science fiction novels
Novels by Kenneth Bulmer
Ace Books books